Tommy Høiland (born 11 April 1989) is a Norwegian professional footballer who plays as a striker for Sandnes Ulf.

Career
Høiland started his career at Bryne before moving to Viking, returning to Bryne and then Sandnes Ulf.

On 10 July 2013 Høiland moved to Molde but less than a year later, on 31 March 2014, Høiland joined Lillestrøm on a season-long loan. Høiland's loan deal was ended early by Lillestrøm, seeing him return to Molde in July.

On 18 February 2016, he signed a three-season contract with Strømsgodset.

On 21 June 2017, he returned to his former club Viking, signing a three-year contract. On 13 February 2020, his contract was extended until the end of the 2022 season. On 17 December 2021, he signed a two-year contract with Sandnes Ulf, whom he played for between 2012 and 2013.

International career
Høiland has represented Norway from under-15 to under-21 level.

Career statistics

Club

Notes

Honours

Club

Molde
 Eliteserien: 2014
 Norwegian Football Cup: 2013, 2014

Viking
 Norwegian First Division: 2018
 Norwegian Football Cup: 2019

Individual
 Norwegian First Division top scorer: 2018

References

1989 births
Living people
Sportspeople from Stavanger
Norwegian footballers
Bryne FK players
Viking FK players
Sandnes Ulf players
Molde FK players
Lillestrøm SK players
Strømsgodset Toppfotball players
Norwegian First Division players
Eliteserien players
Association football forwards
Norway youth international footballers
Norway under-21 international footballers